Thisisme Then: The Best of Common is a compilation album by rapper Common, released November 27, 2007 on Relativity Records. It covers material from his early rap years, spanning 1992 to 1997, and contains singles from Common's first three albums as well as "High Expectations" from the Soul in the Hole soundtrack. The album's title is borrowed from the song "Thisisme", a track that was originally featured on Resurrection and that is featured on Thisisme Then. It was released on LP on January 8, 2008, six weeks after the CD release.

This album excludes his more recent material made during his membership in Soulquarians and his work with Jay Dee, later known as J Dilla.

Track listing

Chart positions

References

Common (rapper) compilation albums
Albums produced by the Beatnuts
Albums produced by No I.D.
2007 greatest hits albums